The Victoria University of Wellington is a public university in Wellington, New Zealand. It was established in 1897 by Act of Parliament, and was a constituent college of the University of New Zealand.

The university is well known for its programmes in law, the humanities, and some scientific disciplines, and offers a broad range of other courses. Entry to all courses at first year is open, and entry to second year in some programmes (e.g. law, criminology, creative writing, architecture, engineering) is restricted.

Victoria had the highest average research grade in the New Zealand Government's Performance Based Research Fund exercise in both 2012 and 2018, having been ranked 4th in 2006 and 3rd in 2003. Victoria has been ranked 215th in the World's Top 500 universities by the QS World University Rankings (2020).

History
Victoria University of Wellington (originally known as Victoria University College) was founded in 1897, named after Queen Victoria, on the 60th anniversary of her coronation. The original name was Victoria University College, but on the dissolution of the University of New Zealand in 1961 Victoria or "Vic" became the Victoria University of Wellington, conferring its own degrees.

Early history and colonial politics 
In 1868, the colonial government of New Zealand passed the University Endowment Act of 1868, which established scholarship programs for study in the home islands of Great Britain, in addition to setting aside a land endowment in the burgeoning colony itself. The following year, with wealth generated from the Otago Gold Rush in addition to a strong foundation of the Scottish Enlightenment, the provincial government of Otago proceeded to lay the groundwork to establish the University of Otago. This was followed by the creation of Canterbury College, associated with the newly formed University of New Zealand. 

In 1878, a royal commission was appointed to review the state of higher education in the country. It recommended the establishment of a federal system of four university colleges, established in Auckland and Wellington, in addition to the integration of the University of Otago and Canterbury College. The colonial government moved to provide sites, statutory grants and land endowments. This was somewhat delayed after the state of recession caused by the collapse of the City of Glasgow Bank in the same year, leading to a contraction in credit from Great Britain, and specifically London, the centre of global finance at the time. Nevertheless, in 1882, parliament passed the Auckland University College Act in 1882.

The growth of the population of Wellington, and the gradual improvement of the economy in the late 1880s were key factors in the final establishment of the college. A prominent advocate of creation was Robert Stout, Premier of New Zealand and later Chief Justice, as well as a member of the university senate. In June 1886, as Minister of Education, Stout signalled the governments intent of introducing a bill to establish a centre for higher learning in Wellington. Being the centre of the colonial government, Stout cited the opportunity for the college to be able to particularly specialize in law, political science, and history.

Stout further suggested that the staff of the New Zealand Colonial Museum could provide services in the fields of geology and natural history. This was indicated in the Wellington University College Bill of 1887, which meant the effective annexation of the museum. Colonial Museum director James Hector voiced considerable opposition to this bill. After a lengthy debate in parliament, this bill was promptly defeated.

Establishment 
In 1897, the current premier, Richard Seddon, who had until this point been unsupportive of the university project, returned from Queen Victoria's Diamond Jubilee celebrations in Great Britain with an honorary Law degree from the University of Cambridge. Seddon decided that the establishment of a college in Wellington would be a suitable way to mark the Queen's jubilee year.

When introducing the Victoria College Bill in December 1897, Seddon stated:

‘I do not think there will be any question as to the necessity for the establishment of a University College here in Wellington,’

The college was to be governed by a 16-man council, with their inaugural meeting taking place on 23 May 1898.

Founding professors 
The founding professors of Victoria College were:

 John Rankine Brown - Professor of Classics
 Hugh Mackenzie - Professor of English language and Literature
 Thomas Easterield - Professor of Chemistry and Physics
 Richard Cockburn Maclaurin - Professor of Mathematics

Early days 
While Victoria College had been legally founded, a grand, a council and a number of students, it had no physical property for the first decade of its existence. Early courses were held at Wellington Girls High School as well as the Technical School building on Victoria Street.

The professors set about creating a unique identity for the college. The somewhat fitting motto "Sapientia magis auro desideranda" was adopted in 1902. In 1903, the college adopted a badge and coat of arms featuring three crowns, the stars of the southern cross and the crest of the namesake of Wellington. It was at this time that the colours of the college were chosen; dark green and gold, taking inspiration of the colours of the nearby gorse covered Tinakori Hill.

In 1903 the council intended to establish a professorship in law, ‘with a desire of to making the Law School at Wellington the most complete in the Colony’, as soon as financially possible. The college appointed a fifth professor, in modern languages - selecting the Oxford educated Anglo-German George von Zedlitz. Zelditz was joined by a newly appointed New Zealand-educated biology professor Harry Borrer Kirk.

Kelburn campus 
The newly appointed Council in 1889 had considered the use of the 13-acre Alexandra Barracks site for a permanent campus. The site was widely supported in Wellington, but release of the land for academic purposes was stalled by the Seddon Government. In February 1901 an offer was made by a wealthy Wairarapa sheep farmer named Charles Pharazyn. Pharazyn offered to donate £1000 if the college was built on a 6-acre plot of hilly land in Kelburn. Coincidentally, Pharazyn held a major financial interest in the then-under construction Kelburn - Karori Tramway (now known as the Wellington Cable Car). The Tramway was completed the following year, and to this day transports students from the central business area of Lambton Quay, to the university via Salamanca Station.

Construction began in 1902, with the regrading of the hillside, with the construction of a main building following shortly after, designed by local architects F. Penty and E.M. Blake in the Gothic Revival style. At the requests of Richard Seddon, the building gained a more imposing demeanor through the insistence of adding a third level. The then governor of New Zealand, Lord Plunket, laid the foundation stone on the 27th of August 1904.

While opened on the 30th of March 1906, the building was not completed to its original design, but was progressively added to as the college grew. In the meantime, students had built tennis courts, as well as a wooden gymnasium and social hall being constructed. The building was named after Thomas Alexander Hunter, the well-regarded professor of mental science and political economy. Following the end of the First World War, north and south wings were added to the building, providing new teaching areas, recreational spaces, and a new library.

Development 
An extramural branch was founded at Palmerston North in 1960. It merged with Massey College on 1 January 1963. Having become a branch of Victoria upon the University of New Zealand's 1961 demise, the merged college became Massey University on 1 January 1964.

In 2004, Victoria celebrated the 100th birthday of its first home, the Hunter Building.

Victoria has expanded beyond its original campus in Kelburn, with campuses in Te Aro (Faculty of Architecture and Design), and Pipitea (opposite Parliament, housing the Faculty of Law and Victoria Business School). Victoria also hosts the Ferrier Research Institute and the Robinson Research Institute in Lower Hutt, the Coastal Ecology Laboratory in Island Bay and the Miramar Creative Centre, in Park Rd, Miramar.

In 2015, Victoria opened a new campus in Auckland to service the growing demand for its courses and expertise.

Name-change proposal

In May 2018 it was reported that Victoria was exploring options to simplify its name to the University of Wellington. Vice-Chancellor Grant Guillford said that the university was pursuing a name change in order to reduce confusion overseas, as several other universities also carried the "Victoria" name. On 27 July 2018, the Victoria University of Wellington Council agreed in principle to the name change, as well as replacing the former Māori name Te Whare Wānanga o Te Upoko o Te Ika a Maui with Te Herenga Waka, the name of the university's marae. Of the 2,000 public submissions on the name-change proposal, 75% strongly opposed it. Alumni and students strongly opposed the name change, staff gave mixed feedback, while Wellington's regional mayors and members of the university's advisory board favoured the name change.

On 24 September 2018 Victoria University's Council voted by a majority of nine to two to change the university's name to the University of Wellington. The council also voted to adopt the new Māori name of Te Herenga Waka. The university's Vice-Chancellor Grant Guilford abstained from the vote, citing a conflict of interest. Critics such as Victoria University law professor Geoff McLay criticized the name change for erasing 120 years of history. By contrast, Chancellor Neil Paviour-Smith defended the outcome of the vote as "one decision in a much broader strategy to try and help the university really achieve its potential". The council would submit its recommendation to the Minister of Education to make the final decision.

On 18 December 2018 the Minister for Education, Chris Hipkins, announced that he had rejected the University Council's recommendation, stating that the proposed change did not have sufficient support from Victoria's staff, students or alumni, and that such a change would not be in keeping with institution accountability or be in the national interest. On 6 May 2019 Victoria University's Council announced that it would not contest the Education Minister's decision to reject its name-change proposal. The name change had received exceptionally strong opposition from faculty, alumni, students, and the Wellington City Council.

The university has, in recent years, distanced itself from the word 'Victoria', with many promotional materials referring solely to 'Wellington's University'. Many departments and initiatives have also been rebranded, for example Victoria Professional and Executive Development becoming Wellington Uni-Professional. In January 2021, the university spent $69,000 on a new sign highlighting the word 'Wellington', which drew criticism from students and staff who said the funds could have been better spent elsewhere.

Governance and administration
From 1938 to 1957, the head of administration was the principal. Since 1957, the head of administration has been the vice-chancellor. The following people held the role of principal and/or vice-chancellor:

Tommy Hunter, 1938–1951
Jim Williams, 1951–1968
Danny Taylor, 1968–1982
Ian Axford, 1982–1985
Les Holborow, 1986–1998
Michael Irving, 1998–2000
Stuart McCutcheon, 2000–2004
Pat Walsh, 2005–2014
Grant Guilford, 2014–2022
Nic Smith, 2023–Present

Guilford retired on 4 March 2022. Professor Jennifer Windsor was named Acting Vice-Chancellor. On 22 June 2022 Victoria University of Wellington announced that Guilford’s replacement as Vice-Chancellor will be Professor Nic Smith, the current Provost at the Queensland University of Technology (QUT). Nic Smith’s tenure as VUW Vice-Chancellor is due to start in January 2023.

Campuses and facilities 

Victoria University of Wellington has three campuses spread out over Wellington city. It also has premises in Auckland.

Wellington 

 The main campus is in the suburb of Kelburn, New Zealand, overlooking the Wellington Central business district, where the Faculties of Humanities and Social Sciences, Science, Engineering, Education and Health are based. Additionally, it is the location of the university's Central Library and the site of its administrative offices. The campus has a range of amenities including cafes, the university book store VicBooks, a pharmacy and health services, childcare facilities, and a sports and recreation centre. The Victoria University of Wellington Students' Association is based here.
 The Pipitea campus consists of the Wellington School of Business and Government, which includes the School of Accounting and Commercial Law, School of Economics and Finance, School of Government, School of Information Management, School of Management, School of Marketing and International Business, and the Faculty of Law. The Campus is located near the New Zealand Parliament Buildings, consisting of Rutherford House, the Old Government Buildings and the West Wing of the Wellington railway station. It is the location of the Commerce and Law libraries. Student services available at the Pipitea campus include Student Health and Well-being, the Recreation Centre and VicBooks.
 The Wellington Faculty of Architecture and Design Innovation is located in the Te Aro Campus. The campus contains an Architecture and Design library.

Auckland 
The School of Business and Government offers selected courses at the Auckland premises, which is located in the Auckland CBD.

Other facilities 
The Victoria University Coastal Ecology Laboratory supports research programs in marine biology and coastal ecology on Wellington's rugged south coast.

The Miramar Creative Centre is located by the Weta Workshop buildings on Park Road, Miramar. The centre offers access to work experience and connections with New Zealand's film, animation and game design industries.

Library 
The library was established in 1899. The collections are dispersed over four locations: Kelburn Library, Law Library, Architecture and Design Library and Commerce Library. The library also has a collection of digital resources and full text material online. In addition to electronic resources, printed books and journals, the Library also acquires works in microform, sound recordings, videos and other media consistent with the university's academic programme needs.

The library holds approximately 1.3 million printed volumes. It provides access to 70,000 print and electronic periodical titles and 200,000 e-books. It is an official Depository Library (DL-296) of the United Nations System (DEPOLIB), one of only three in the country. The J. C. Beaglehole Room is the official repository of all archival and manuscript material, and provides a supervised research service for Rare Books, for fine or fragile print items, and for 'last resort' copies of university publications.

The New Zealand Electronic Text Centre (NZETC) is a digital library of significant New Zealand and Pacific Island texts and materials, and is arranged according to the library of Congress classification system. The library has two online repositories: the ResearchArchive is its open research repository, which makes the university's research freely available online and the RestrictedArchive, which is the university's private research repository and is accessible only to Victoria University staff and students.

Between April 2003 and February 2010 the library was home to two locally famous residents, Tessa Brown and Sandy Rankine, a pair of library cats.

Campus developments

Te Huanui and 320 The Terrace 

In September 2014, the university announced that it would purchase the abandoned Gordon Wilson Flats from Housing New Zealand. It was subsequently revealed that the purchase price was over NZD 6 million. The university bought the site due to its close proximity to the Kelburn campus, with the potential to create a link between Ghuznee St and the Terrace to the campus. 

In July 2015, Urban Perspectives Limited, on behalf of Victoria University, lodged an application with Wellington City Council to rezone the area from "Inner Residential Area" to "Institutional Precinct", remove the Flats from the City District Plan's heritage list, and amend the Institutional Precinct provisions of the District Plan. Residents supported the removal of the flats from the area, as it was a significant case of urban decay in the area, while various groups, such as the Wellington Architectural Centre opposed the demolition of the flats, noting their architectural significance.

The Gordon Wilson Flats have exceptional architectural significance. Not only are they associated with F. Gordon Wilson, one of the most prominent, powerful and influential architects in New Zealand from the 1930s through to the 1950s but they are the last of a line of highly important high rise social housing projects built by the state. They were initiated by the first Labour Government of 1935 and they reflect and have a direct connection with international modernism.

This issue bought up wider debate on whether it was worth retaining mid-century public housing for heritage purposes, when the building in question had itself paid scant value towards the past.

In April 2016, a Wellington City Council panel approved the rezoning of the flats, allowing Victoria University to demolish the building. However, in July 2016, the Architectural Centre lodged an appeal in the Environment Court against the Wellington City Council's decision to remove the Gordon Wilson flats' heritage status under Wellington's District Plan. The appeal was successful with the court determining that the heritage listing should stand in August 2017.

In 2018, Victoria University students Jessie Rogers and Hannah Rushton mapped the building using LIDAR mapping technology. This data was then used to create a computer generated model of the flats, allowing for them to be explored in a virtual reality environment. This virtual reality experience was them displayed at an exhibition named Immersive Legacies: 320 The Terrace, at the Wellington Museum, allowing for users to see information about the building, the building in its prime state, and the current deterioration of the structure.

In July 2020, Victoria University unveiled plans for what they called 'Te Huanui'. The plan showed that the university could be rezoning the site for institutional use, demolishing the Gordon Wilson Flats, while retaining the nearby McLeans Flats. The area would then be used to create a gateway between the hilltop Kelburn campus, and the city below, including an outdoor plaza and new teaching and research facilities. The development would also create a pedestrian and elevator link up to the Kelburn campus.

National Centre for Music 

In 2019, Victoria University, on behalf of the New Zealand School of Music, signed an agreement with Wellington City Council and the New Zealand Symphony Orchestra to establish a new National Music Centre based in Wellington Town Hall. This would be established once refurbishment work on the town hall had been completed.

Victoria University vice-chancellor Grant Guilford believed the national music centre would provide a real uplift for music and music education.

The state-of-the-art teaching, rehearsal, research and performance spaces that it will offer will enable an outstanding education for the next generation of musicians

The Living Pā 
The Living Pa will be a redevelopment of the marae and surrounding area of the Kelburn campus. This will involve the removal of five buildings from 42 to 50 Kelburn Parade and the creation of a new building employing principles based on the Living Building Challenge. Preparation work began in mid 2021, starting with the clearance and demolition of existing buildings on the construction site.

Organisation and administration

Day-to-day governance is in the hands of the University Council, which consists of 20 people: four elected by the Court of Convocation, three elected by the academic staff, one elected by the general staff, two appointed by the student union executive, four appointed by the Minister of Education, four selected by the Council itself, and the Vice-Chancellor. The Court of Convocation is composed of all graduates who choose to participate. Charles Wilson, at the time the chief librarian of the parliamentary library, was a member of the original council and its chairman for two years.

For New Zealand residents entry to most courses is open, with a few exceptions. Performance Music requires an audition. There is selection for entry into the second year in degrees such as the LLB, BAS and BDes. BA in criminology and creative writing is also based on selection.

It owns the New Zealand School of Music.

Faculties
The faculties are:
 Wellington Faculty of Architecture and Design Innovation
 Wellington School of Business and Government
 Wellington Faculty of Education
 Wellington Faculty of Engineering
 Wellington Faculty of Graduate Research
 Wellington Faculty of Humanities and Social Sciences
 Faculty of Law
Wellington Faculty of Science
Wellington Faculty of Health

Faculty of Law
The Faculty of Law is located in the restored Old Government Buildings at the centre of the country's law-making precinct, in close proximity to Parliament, the Supreme Court and the Court of Appeal, and the District and High courts. The faculty is rated 65th in the world in the 2021 QS World University Rankings and led New Zealand's law faculties for research in the most recent Performance-Based Research Fund Evaluation in 2006.

Academic profile

Academic rankings

Research centres and institutes

Victoria has more than 40 research centres and institutes, including
 MacDiarmid Institute for Advanced Materials and Nanotechnology
Robinson Research Institute
Ferrier Research Institute
 Malaghan Institute of Medical Research
 Victoria University Coastal Ecology Laboratory
 Centre for Strategic Studies New Zealand
 Language Learning Centre
 Adam Art Gallery
 New Zealand Electronic Text Centre
 Antarctic Research Centre
 International Institute of Modern Letters
 New Zealand India Research Institute
To see more, browse an A-Z List of Research Centres and Institutes

Student life

Students' associations and student media
 Victoria University of Wellington Students' Association (VUWSA)
 Salient (student media)

Halls of residence 
 Victoria operated
 Boulcott Hall (catered)
 Capital Hall (catered)
 Joan Stevens Hall (catered)
 Katharine Jermyn Hall (catered)
 Te Puni Village (catered)
 Weir House (catered)
 Willis St: Cumberland House (catered)
 Willis St: Education House (self-catered)
 University Hall (self-catered)
 University Hall: Whānau House (self-catered)

 Privately operated
 Victoria House (catered)
 Helen Lowry Hall (catered)
 Everton Hall (self-catered)
 Stafford House (self-catered)

Controversies 
In 2010 there was widespread condemnation of Victoria University of Wellington removing the Gender Studies department. In 2017, a minor in Gender Studies was made available.

In 2012 a Facebook page that is associated with Victoria University of Wellington students, Overheard @ Vic, was in the media for the many rape comments that were made. These included comments like "you've got to rape the paper, man, you can't let the paper rape you" and "at least ugly girls don't get raped". In response to this, a spokesperson for Victoria University of Wellington said that "student safety was a key focus, and the university had partnered with police and Wellington City Council to promote awareness of personal safety".

In late 2015, academics and students at Victoria University of Wellington spoke out at the university hosting Israeli Defence Force troops for a public lecture. The opposition for this public lecture came about because of the soldiers' involvement in Operation Protective Edge, which is thought to have killed at least 2000 Palestinians, most of them civilians.

In July, 2016, a Victoria University of Wellington staff member Rebekah Proctor was jailed for two years and five months for defrauding the university out of $480,000 – as of 27 October Proctor has appealed her sentence. In October 2016 students protested the cut of several European languages, including the German language department losing 43% of staff. Also in 2016, Victoria University of Wellington was embroiled in a row with the Tertiary Education Union, when it was discovered that union members were being paid less than non-union members. This led the TEU to characterise the Vice-Chancellor Grant Guilford as being anti-union, and resulted in a one-day strike.

In April 2020, during the COVID-19 outbreak, the university came under fire from students, politicians, and media for suddenly announcing at 48 hours notice that they would be charging students a "placeholder fee" ($150 per week) for student accommodation that they had been forcibly removed from, despite emails from the university previously telling those same students that they would not have to pay.

Notable academics and staff

William Alington (architect), architect
James Belich, historian
Doreen Blumhardt, education academic
Jonathan Boston, public policy academic
Mai Chen, public law lawyer
Paul Callaghan, physical sciences academic
Margaret Clark, political science academic
Sally Davenport, management academic
Lloyd Geering, religious studies academic
Bill Hastings, chief censor and judge
Robert Walker Hay FRSE, chemist
Frank Holmes, economics academic
George Edward Hughes, philosophy academic
Joanna Kidman, sociologist
Allison Kirkman, sociologist
Wendy Larner, social scientist, Provost
Douglas Lilburn, music academic
Richard Cockburn Maclaurin, mathematics academic
Bill Manhire, author and poet
Douglas Mews, academic and early keyboard specialist
Paul Morris, religious studies academic
Peter Munz, history academic
Terence O'Brien, diplomat and academic
Tipene O'Regan, Māori leader and education academic
Vincent O'Sullivan, academic and poet
Geoffrey Palmer, politician
Matthew Palmer, law academic
Pat Ralph, marine biologist; first woman at Victoria to be awarded a DSc
Prof. James Renwick, climate scientist and science communicator
Ivor Richardson, lawyer and academic
Claudia Scott, public policy academic
Kim Sterelny, philosophy academic
Teresia Teaiwa, Pacific studies academic, author, poet
Helen Tippett, Architecture academic, architect
Matt Visser, specialist in general relativity
Colleen Ward, cross-cultural psychologist academic
Colin J. N. Wilson, volcanology academic
Whatarangi Winiata, Māori leader and Professor of Accountancy
John Chapman Andrew, foundation Vice Chancellor
Warwick Murray, geography and development studies academic, musician
Nicholas Agar, philosophy academic

Notable alumni

See also

Tertiary education in New Zealand

References

External links

Victoria University of Wellington's website
Victoria University of Wellington Students' Association
Victoria University of Wellington Library

 
Wellington City
Public universities
Universities in New Zealand
Educational institutions established in 1897
1897 establishments in New Zealand
1890s in Wellington